Alexander Ogando Bautista (born 3 May 2000) is a sprinter from the Dominican Republic. He won the silver medal for the mixed 4 x 400 metres relay at the 2020 Tokyo Olympics, and a gold at the 2022 World Athletics Championships.

He won the 200 m gold medal in the 2021 NACAC U23 Championships. Ogando placed fifth in the event at the 2022 World Championships in Eugene, Oregon.

Achievements

International competitions

References

2000 births
Living people
Dominican Republic male sprinters
Athletes (track and field) at the 2020 Summer Olympics
Olympic athletes of the Dominican Republic
Olympic silver medalists for the Dominican Republic
Olympic silver medalists in athletics (track and field)
Medalists at the 2020 Summer Olympics
People from San Juan de la Maguana
21st-century Dominican Republic people
World Athletics Championships winners
World Athletics Championships athletes for the Dominican Republic